Coleophora dormiens is a moth of the family Coleophoridae. It is found in Turkestan and Uzbekistan.

Adults are on wing in late autumn.

The larvae feed on Halothamnus subaphyllus, Halothamnus glaucus subsp. hispidulus and Halothamnus glaucus subsp. glaucus. They create a leafy case, consisting of two parts differing in thickness. The caudal part is thinner, sometimes with longitudinal ridges formed by folds of leaves stretched by the larva. One or even both parts may consist of two pieces woven firmly together with no visible suture. The valve is three-sided and the length of the case is 12–14 mm. The color is grayish-yellow or yellow to chocolate-brown, usually without darker longitudinal stripes. Larvae can be found from the end of April to May. Eggs hibernate.

References

dormiens
Moths described in 1972
Moths of Asia